A pill thermometer is an ingestible thermometer that allows a person's core temperature to be continuously monitored. It was developed by NASA in collaboration with Johns Hopkins University for use with astronauts. Since then the pill has been used by mountain climbers, football players, cyclists, F1 drivers. and in the mining industry.

The Thermometer Pill is currently manufactured by the company, HQ Inc under the brand name CorTemp.

References

External resources
 HQ Inc  - the manufacturer of the pill
 The pill's patent
 Transcript of the NOVA episode, "Deadly Ascent" which features the pill prominently

Thermometers
NASA spin-off technologies